Queen of England or English Queen, may refer to:

Royalty
 A female English monarch
 Anne, Queen of Great Britain (1665-1714), the last monarch to hold the title Queen of England (1702-1707)
 A female English royal consort, a female spouse of an English monarch
Elizabeth II (1926-2022, r. 1952-2022), the former Queen of the United Kingdom, has been incorrectly called the Queen of England

Other uses
 "Queen Of England", a 2002 song by Roger Glover & The Guilty Party from the album Snapshot
 "The Queen of England", a 2018 episode of the American TV series Santa Clarita Diet
 Queen of England, a British barque shipwrecked in September 1865

See also

English monarchy
Succession to the British throne